The men's 4 x 400 metres relay at the 1938 European Athletics Championships was held in Paris, France, at Stade Olympique de Colombes on 5 September 1938.

Medalists

Results

Final
5 September

Participation
According to an unofficial count, 24 athletes from 6 countries participated in the event.

 (4)
 (4)
 (4)
 (4)
 (4)
 (4)

References

4 x 400 metres relay
4 x 400 metres relay at the European Athletics Championships